Smorzewo  is a village in the administrative district of Gmina Gozdowo, within Sierpc County, Masovian Voivodeship, in east-central Poland.

The village has a population of 50.

References

Smorzewo